Hyram Yarbro is an American skincare influencer known for his Skincare by Hyram videos on YouTube and TikTok. His videos consist primarily of product reviews, skincare advice, and reactions to celebrity skincare routine videos. In 2021 he launched his own skin care product line, Selfless by Hyram, with Sephora.

Early life and education 

Yarbo was born in Paulden, Arizona and grew up on a cattle ranch.  He is one of five children and was raised in a deeply Mormon household; according to Yarbro, his childhood home "was a very religious environment with no internet and highly restricted materials". Deeply disapproving of homosexuality, Yarbro claimed his family expressed, "extremely violent rhetoric and dangerous remarks made about gay people" and that he was kicked out of the family home when he came out as gay. According to Yarbro, he suffered from depression, eating disorders and self-harm throughout his teen years and early twenties as a result, and he attempted suicide during this time.

Aged 18, Yarbro moved from Arizona to Honolulu, Hawaii in 2014 to study at Brigham Young University, later dropping out for financial reasons. According to Yarbro, while at college he experienced premature aging and became passionate about skincare products when he used them and saw how effective they could be. He went on to work as a make-up artist at Saks Fifth Avenue. Yarbro has described his motivation for starting his YouTube channel as being borne out of a realization whilst working the job that there weren't any resources online about skincare directed towards consumers.

Career 
Yarbro began his YouTube channel in 2017. In 2019, he went from 50,000 to 500,000 subscribers in under two weeks, and later in the year reached a million. He joined TikTok in 2020 and experienced further growth during the COVID-19 lockdown, going from 100,000 followers on TikTok in March to over 6 million by September. Between March and October 2020, Yarbro released videos about the L'Oréal sub-brand Cerave that were credited with contributing to increased popularity and sales of the brand. During this period, his videos contributed $3.2 million in media impact value for the brand and reportedly led to a 89% increase in its global sales in 2020. This led to Yarbro receiving a paid partnership from L'Oréal to create branded content on TikTok and YouTube. In October 2020, Yarbro signed with United Talent Agency. That December, he announced his first ever product collaboration with the Hyram x Kinship Sea the Good collection. A portion of the collection's profits were donated to Lonely Whale, a charity devoted to removing plastic from oceans. In 2022, he started a podcast called Justaposition, a play on the word juxtaposition, which is centred around exploring his and other influencers' mental health journeys. That year he also began posting to Flip, a social media app similar to TikTok; although according to Glossy, he had only a small following on the app as of that August.

Selfless by Hyram
In June 2021, Yarbro launched his own line of skincare products called Selfless by Hyram consisting of five products priced between $20 and $30. The line was created in collaboration with Colette Laxton and Mark Curry, co-founders of skincare brand The Inkey List, and released exclusively to Sephora stores in 29 countries and online on June 24. Yarbro teamed up with non-profits Rainforest Trust, Youth, and Thirst for the release of the line with the aim of protecting over 2,500 acres from deforestation, restoring over 370,000 tons of carbon dioxide into the atmosphere, and funding clean water projects in over 60 African communities in the first year after release. The line was released in the UK in March 2022.

In a review of the line for The Independent, Louise Whitbread praised the choice of ingredients in the products, which she says are "proven to make a difference to skin" and gave especial praise to the Centella & Green Tea Hydrating Gel Cleanser. She also found the provided information about the social impact of the products "informative and useful". Marriska Fernandes of Yahoo! Canada Style praised the consistency and effectiveness of the products, and called the Niacinamide & Maracuja Daily Barrier Support Moisturizer "one of [her] favourite products in the line".

Content 
Yarbro is amongst a wave of social media influencers on platforms such as TikTok referred to as "skinfluencers" for their focus on skincare products. He has also been described as "at the forefront of the men's skincare movement" by GQ Australia. His content consists of reviews and recommendations of beauty products, skincare tutorials, and reaction videos in which he reacts to the skincare regimes of his fans and online influencers. On TikTok, Yarbro utilizes the duet feature to make such reaction videos, often responding to users posting under the hashtag #skincarebyhyram. According to lifestyle magazine Elle, he also uses the feature to debunk skincare myths propagated by other users. He is known for recommending products which are at a lower price point, generally at a price under $50 and regularly under $10.

Yarbro's reviews have been described as taking an ingredients-first approach and he has become known for his catchphrase "the ingredients don't lie" which has appeared in his merchandising. According to The Washington Post, Yarbro's brand focuses on promoting "clean beauty" consisting of products with safe, organic ingredients. According to The Independent, he disapproves of products containing fragrances and essential oils whilst praising brands that utilise sustainable practices to make their products. Yarbro states in his content that he is not a licensed dermatologist or aesthetician, instead calling himself as "skincare specialist", and has claimed that his content should not be taken as medical advice but as "shopping with a best friend". Yarbro's audience is primarily made up of generation Z and is 90% women.

Yarbro makes money from his content via affiliate links, YouTube ads, and brand sponsorships. He has stated that he refuses 90 to 95% of brand deals offered to him on the basis of product ingredients and price, and a desire to retain the trust of his audience. Yarbro also avoids working with luxury brands due to his focus on recommending more affordable products.

Criticism 
Yarbro has been criticized along these lines for promoting a trend called "slugging" in which Vaseline is applied thickly to the face and left overnight which dermatologists say can worsen acne. Nylon included excessive slugging on their list of the 10 worst beauty trends on TikTok of 2021, naming Yarbro as one of the influencers that promoted the trend. Doctors have stated that consumers should not take skincare advice from influencers on TikTok.

Awards and nominations

References 

American TikTokers
American YouTubers
YouTube channels launched in 2017
Beauty and makeup YouTubers
Living people
English-language YouTube channels
LGBT YouTubers
LGBT TikTokers
Social media influencers
LGBT people from Arizona
Year of birth missing (living people)
Gay entertainers